In mathematics, a leaky integrator equation is a specific differential equation,  used to describe a component or system that takes the integral of an input, but gradually leaks a small amount of input over time. It appears commonly in hydraulics, electronics, and neuroscience where it can represent either a single neuron or a local population of neurons. 

This is equivalent to a 1st-order highpass filter with cutoff frequency far below the frequencies of interest.

Equation
The equation is of the form

where C is the input and A is the rate of the 'leak'.

General solution
The equation is a nonhomogeneous  first-order linear differential equation. For constant C its solution is

where  is a constant encoding the initial condition.

References

Differential equations